Kgosi (Chief) Luka Jantjie was a hunter, trader, diamond prospector, and farmer. He was a chief of the Batlhaping ba Manyeding group of the Batswana in Kuruman. He was born in Kimberley, South Africa in 1835 and was the son of a Christian convert. Jantjie spent most of his life protecting the rights to land of his people and is considered a struggle hero for his battle against British colonialism. He was the cousin of Kgosi Galeshewe.

Resistance and conflict
When diamonds were discovered in Kimberley in 1871,  British colonists from the Cape Colony swarmed onto Jantjie's land in search of diamonds and took it over. Jantjie and his people were the first local people whose ancestral land was stolen from them due to diamond prospecting by colonists. Jantjie was outspoken against the land invasion, however, he initially took a non-violent approach towards the British which included boycotting the rural trading stores. In addition, Jantjie fought for his people to attain equal rights to purchase diamond licenses so that they could share in the wealth that was being excavated on their land. However, the government of the Cape Colony refused to grant mining rights to native groups. Jantjie took up arms in response and orchestrated skirmishes against the British. Jantjie's confrontations with British authorities earned him the epithet of being “a wild fellow who hates the English”.

Over the next decade, the Batlhaping, Tlharo and Rolong people were evicted from much of their land and confined to reserves. In 1895, the area was annexed by the Cape Colony which resulted in Tswana groups being moved to even smaller reserves. These groups were also forced to pay taxes such as the hut tax, to work on white farms, and as migrant mine workers for the Kimberley mine. In addition the Rinderpest regulations and the shooting of cattle owned by Africans in the Taung Reserves were undertaken. After Jantjie's cattle were shot, he demanded of the policeman in charge, Corporal Denyssen, to know why his cattle were shot. He was shown a policy on Rinderpest and cattle roaming out of the owner's territory. He then demanded compensation from the corporal, which was refused. These events sparked the Langeberg Rebellion. The rebellion was led by Batlhaping chief Kgosi Galeshewe.

Death and Significance 
In August 1897, the colonial police invaded the Langeberg Mountains where Jantjie and other rebels had orchestrated a last stand. Jantjie was discovered by Temple Smythe, a member of the Cape Medical Staff Corps, in a cave on the Gamasep Kopje near Olifantshoek. Jantjie opened fire upon Smythe's approach, however, his gun misfired. Smythe took this opportunity and shot Jantjie in the head with a revolver. As a sign of humiliation and a warning to other rebels, it was reported that, while Jantjie was dying, Smythe and his troops posed to take photos with him. When Jantjie died, the British troops decapitated his corpse and took his head as a trophy.

Jantjie's death is regarded as the collapse of the Tswana resistance. In the aftermath, 4 000 men, women and children of the Bwere were taken captive and sent to the Cape Colony to work as unpaid labour for local white farmers. Many of the rebels were hanged for their contribution in orchestrating the rebellion. The rebellion officially ended on 3 August 1897 following the death of over 1 500 men. Currently there is no record of where Jantjie's remains are buried, nor the fate of his skull.

In 2011 the book Luka Jantjie: Resistance Hero of the South African Frontier was published. Authored by Kevin Shillington, the book recounts Jantjie's legacy and contributions. In April 2016, a building on Sol Plaatje University campus, Kimberley, was renamed Luka Jantjie House in Jantjie's honor.

References

See also
Kgosi Galeshewe
Kimberley, Northern Cape
Batswana
Bechuanaland
Rolong tribe
Tswana people
Rinderpest
Taung

1835 births
1897 deaths
Batlhaping tribe